TruckersFM, also known as Truckers.FM or TFM, is an independent online radio station created by the Euro Truck Simulator 2 and American Truck Simulator community, and also features in other simulator genres such as Farming Simulator. The station was founded in October 2015 by brothers Alexander and Joshua Blackman.

TruckersFM is run by a team of volunteer radio presenters who broadcast a variety of live shows consisting of music, entertainment and related gaming news.

The station predominately plays chart music, pop music as well as rock and EDM. Their sister radio station, BigRigFM primarily plays country music. TruckersFM is available online, on various audio streaming services such as TuneIn and on smart speakers such as Amazon Echo. TruckersFM is featured within the in-game radio directories of the simulation game titles Euro Truck Simulator 2, American Truck Simulator and Farming Simulator 19.

British video game news site Eurogamer describes TruckersFM as "an alternative to listening to real-world radio stations inside a game, (which) has become an alternative to real-world stations out in the real world."

The station is primarily funded by on-air advertising from community-related groups, streamers and virtual trucking companies as well as listener donations via Patreon.

History 
Launched in October 2015, TruckersFM was created as a dedicated radio station by the Truck Simulator and TruckersMP multiplayer modification communities. The idea behind the station is to allow players to tune into a radio station that provides news, entertaining stories, virtual traffic reports and on-air competitions for them to interact with.

TruckersFM was added to the Euro Truck Simulator 2 in-game radio player on 6 January 2016 and later into the American Truck Simulator in-game radio player on 2 February 2016.

On 11 May 2017, TruckersFM gained partner status with Discord, a proprietary freeware VoIP application designed for creating communities ranging from gamers to education and businesses. Its Discord community has over 18,000 members, which makes it one of the more popular communities in the music category on Discord.

In February 2018, members of the TruckersFM team visited the headquarters of SCS Software, the developers of Euro Truck Simulator 2 and American Truck Simulator. The visit resulted in a closer relationship between the station and game developers, as well as the creation of exclusive radio imaging for TruckersFM, consisting of members of the game's development team saying the TruckersFM slogan.

On 8 August 2019, TruckersFM was added to the Farming Simulator 19 radio directory for players to listen directly in-game whilst playing.

In October 2019, TruckersMP, the community created multiplayer modification for Euro Truck Simulator 2 and American Truck Simulator, partnered with TruckersFM to provide exclusive updates, official events, and giveaways for the simulation community.

On 26 May 2019, TruckersFM launched a new sister station called BigRigFM, a country music radio station, created to cater specifically for the American 18-wheeler truck drivers section of the Truck Simulator community. This station broadcast without presenters until 23 April 2022, when Cowie presented the official launch show.

On October 16, 2020, TruckersFM celebrated its 5th Anniversary of broadcasting with a virtual in-game festival on the Euro Truck Simulator 2 multiplayer modification, TruckersMP. They also partnered up with gaming brands and developers such as HyperX, Focus Home Interactive, SCS Software and Fanatec to giveaway over 2000 euros worth of prizes to listeners and followers on their social media channels.

Programming 

TruckersFM broadcasts a variety of programming, produced by a team of volunteer radio presenters based across the world.

It broadcasts around the clock, with programmes such as "The Most Played Chart", "Matt's Mood Boosters", "The Ninja Takeover", "Morning Coffee with Jay", "The Feel Good Friday Show", "The Texmix Request Show", "Exhibition", "Exodus Radio", and many more.

Street Team 

Being a heavily community-orientated radio station, TruckersFM launched its own virtual 'Street Team' in October 2018. The Street Team organize seasonal (previously monthly) online convoys and large alternative events on the TruckersMP multiplayer modification, allowing the presenters and staff of TruckersFM to directly interact with the community. These virtual convoys generally see over 400 online players attend and participate, and on occasions have seen between 500 and 700 attendees.

The scale of Street Team Convoys assisted in the creation of a formal partnership with TruckersMP, who noted that TruckersFM "are one of the largest communities that contributes significantly to TruckersMP on a regular basis."

References

External links 

 Truckers.FM official website

Internet radio stations in the United Kingdom
Truck simulation video games